Elektrostal (from Russian Электро (Elektro), lit: Electric and Сталь (Stal), lit: Steel) is a city in Moscow Oblast, Russia, located  east of Moscow.  Population:    135,000 (1977); 123,000 (1970); 97,000 (1959); 43,000 (1939). It was previously known as Zatishye (until 1928).

History
It was known as Zatishye until 1928. In 1938, it was granted town status.

Administrative and municipal status
Within the framework of administrative divisions, it is incorporated as Elektrostal City Under Oblast Jurisdiction—an administrative unit with the status equal to that of the districts. As a municipal division, Elektrostal City Under Oblast Jurisdiction is incorporated as Elektrostal Urban Okrug.

Economy
Elektrostal is a center of metallurgy and heavy machinery manufacturing. Major companies include:
 Elektrostal metallurgical factory
 Elektrostal chemical-mechanical factory
 Elektrostal Heavy Engineering Works, JSC is a designer and manufacturer of equipment for producing seamless hot-rolled, cold-rolled and welded steel materials and metallurgical equipment.
 The Powerline Ekibastuz-Kokshetau connects Elektrostal to the GRES-2 Power Station in Ekibastuz.  The power-line was designed for 1150 kV but currently only operates at 400 kV over the section Kokshetau—Elektrostal.

The 9th radio center in Elektrostal is home to a high power medium wave transmitter.

The first S-400 Triumf missile defense system was deployed at Elektrostal, becoming fully operational on July 1, 2007.

Transportation

Elektrostal is linked by Elektrichka suburban electric trains to Moscow's Kursky Rail Terminal with a travel time of 1 hour and 20 minutes. Long distance buses link Elektrostal to Noginsk, Moscow and other nearby towns. Local public transport includes buses.

Sports

The city ice hockey team Kristall Elektrostal was established in 1949 and plays in the Junior Hockey League Division B.

Notable people

 Yevgeni Malkov, association football player
 Anastasia Pozdniakova, Olympic diver
 Vitali Proshkin, ice hockey player
 Vladimir Zharkov, ice hockey player
 Nikolay Vtorov, industrialist
 Ivan Sergeyevich Kuznetsov, city architect
 Vyacheslav Zudov, cosmonaut
 Evgeni Kovyrshin, ice hockey player

International relations

Twin towns and sister cities
Elektrostal is twinned with:
  Pernik, Bulgaria
  Polotsk, Belarus
  Strumica, North Macedonia

References

Notes

Sources

External links
 
 Official website of Elektrostal 
 Elektrostal Business Directory 

Cities and towns in Moscow Oblast